Homalocalyx inerrabundus is a member of the family Myrtaceae endemic to Western Australia.

It blooms between September and November producing violet-pink flowers.

It is found on sand plains in a small are in the Mid West region of Western Australia near Geraldton where it grows in sandy and sandy-loamy soils.

References

inerrabundus
Endemic flora of Western Australia
Myrtales of Australia
Rosids of Western Australia
Plants described in 1987